Ulkottai (North) is a village in the Udayarpalayam taluk of Ariyalur district, Tamil Nadu, India.

Demographics 

As per the 2001 census, Ulkottai (North) had a total population of 5285 with 2691 males and 2594 females.

References 

Villages in Ariyalur district